Kari Aronpuro (born 30 June 1940) is a Finnish poet. He worked in the library industry for over 40 years. He worked as a librarian at the University of Tampere course library from 1964 to 1971, Rääkkylän municipal library in 1972, Kemin  library from 1972 to 1981 and the Tampere  library from 1981 to 2003.

Awards and decorations 
 2004: Pro Finlandia Medal of the Order of the Lion of Finland
 2011: Eino Leino Prize
 1987: Runeberg Prize
 1964: J. H. Erkko Award

References 

20th-century Finnish poets
Living people
1940 births
21st-century Finnish poets
Finnish male poets
Finnish librarians
20th-century male writers
21st-century male writers